Aldo Cipullo (c.1942 – 1984) was an Italian-born American jewelry designer.

Early life and education 
Cipullo was born in 1942 in Naples, Italy and grew up largely in Rome. His father owned a costume jewelry manufacturing business and so he was born into a design family. After finishing graduating school, he began an apprenticeship in the jewelry industry. He immigrated to America in 1959 where he started his studies at Manhattan's School of Visual Arts.

Career 
After his studies he worked as designer for the American jeweler David Webb before joining Tiffany & Co.

In 1969 Cipullo began to work for Cartier.

There he designed the Love bracelet for Cartier and created the Juste Un Clou and the Nail Collection in 1971.

In 1974 he left Cartier and launched his own freelance atelier. He designed collections of costume and men's jewelry. The American Gem Society commissioned him in 1978 to create a collection of pieces using gems mined in North America, which is now seen at the Smithsonian Museum.

In 1984 he died after suffering two heart attacks at the age of 42.

Awards 
He won the Coty Award for jewelry in 1974.

References

1940s births
1984 deaths
Italian emigrants to the United States
Artists from Rome
People from New York City
Italian jewellery designers
American jewelry designers